The Sandbar Plantation is a historic plantation with a mansion in Port Allen, Louisiana, U.S.. It was built circa 1837 for Dr. Thomas Philander and his wife, Marie Aureline Vaughan. It was purchased by Chas. H. Dameron in 1925. It has been listed on the National Register of Historic Places since September 2, 1999.

References

Houses on the National Register of Historic Places in Louisiana
Houses completed in 1837
Greek Revival architecture in Louisiana
Colonial Revival architecture in Louisiana
Buildings and structures in West Baton Rouge Parish, Louisiana
Plantations in Louisiana